The Legislative Assembly of Bahia is the unicameral legislature of Bahia state in Brazil, it's currently based on Administrative Center of Bahia in Salvador. It has 63 state deputies elected by proportional representation.

The legislative power of Bahia began with the General Council of the Province in 1828, it had 21 members and had only the function of suggesting laws for the General Assembly of the Empire. In 1835 the Provincial Assembly was actually created, from the first to the 11th legislature the Assembly functioned in the Convento do Carmo, in 1858 it started to function next to the Paço Municipal, from 1891 the assembly became bicameral where the chamber and the Senate functioned in different buildings, during the Estado Novo in 1947 the legislature became unicameral again.

External links
 Official website

Bahia
Bahia
Bahia